North India is a loosely defined region consisting of the northern part of India. The dominant geographical features of North India are the Indo-Gangetic Plain and the Himalayas, which demarcate the region from the Tibetan Plateau and Central Asia.

The term North India has varying definitions. The Ministry of Home Affairs in its Northern Zonal Council Administrative division included the states of Haryana, Himachal Pradesh, Punjab and Rajasthan and Union Territories of Chandigarh, Delhi, Jammu and Kashmir and Ladakh. The Ministry of Culture in its North Culture Zone includes the state of Uttarakhand but excludes Delhi whereas the Geological Survey of India includes Uttar Pradesh and Delhi but excludes Rajasthan and Chandigarh. Other states sometimes included are Bihar, Gujarat, Jharkhand, Madhya Pradesh and West Bengal.

North India has been the historical centre of the Mughal Empire, the Delhi Sultanate and the British Indian Empire. It has a diverse culture, and includes the Hindu pilgrimage centres of Char Dham, Haridwar, Varanasi, Ayodhya, Mathura, Allahabad, Vaishno Devi and Pushkar, the Buddhist pilgrimage centres of Sarnath and Kushinagar, the Sikh Golden Temple as well as world heritage sites such as the Nanda Devi Biosphere Reserve, Khajuraho temples, Hill Forts of Rajasthan, Jantar Mantar (Jaipur), Qutb Minar, Red Fort, Agra Fort, Fatehpur Sikri and the Taj Mahal. North India's culture, Ganga-Jamuni tehzeeb, developed as a result of interaction between these Hindu and Muslim religious traditions. North India has the third-largest gross domestic product than any other region in India.

The languages that are official  in one or more of the states and union territories located in North India are Hindi, Urdu, Punjabi, Kashmiri, Dogri, and English.

Definitions
Different authorities and sources define North India differently.

Government of India definitions
The Northern Zonal Council is one of the advisory councils, created in 1956 by the States Reorganisation Act to foster interstate co-operation under the Ministry of Home Affairs, which included the states of Chandigarh, Delhi, Haryana, Himachal Pradesh, Jammu and Kashmir, Ladakh, Punjab and Rajasthan.

The Ministry of Culture established the North Culture Zone in Patiala, Punjab on 23 March 1985. It differs from the North Zonal Council in its inclusion of Uttarakhand and the omission of Delhi.

In contrast, the Geological Survey of India (part of the Ministry of Mines) included Uttar Pradesh and Delhi in its Northern Region, but excluded Rajasthan and Chandigarh, with a regional headquarters in Lucknow.

Wider definition

Indian press definition
The Hindu newspaper puts Bihar, Delhi and Uttar Pradesh related articles on its North pages. Articles in the Indian press have included the states of Bihar, Gujarat, Jharkhand, Madhya Pradesh, and West Bengal in North India as well.

Latitude-based definition
The Tropic of Cancer, which divides the temperate zone from the tropical zone in the Northern Hemisphere, runs through India, and could theoretically be regarded as a geographical dividing line in the country. Indian states that are entirely above the Tropic of Cancer are Himachal Pradesh, Punjab, Haryana, Delhi, Uttarakhand, Uttar Pradesh and Bihar and most of North East Indian states. However that definition would also include major parts of Rajasthan, Madhya Pradesh, Jharkhand and West Bengal and minor regions of Chhattisgarh and Gujarat.

Anecdotal usage
In Mumbai, the term "North Indian" is sometimes used to describe migrants from eastern Uttar Pradesh and Bihar, often using the term bhaiya (which literally means 'elder brother') along with it in a derogatory sense, however these very people are not considered North Indian by the inhabitants of Punjab, Himachal Pradesh, Uttarakhand, Haryana and Rajasthan. In Punjab, they are often referred to as Purabias, meaning Easterners. The Government of Bihar official site places the state in the eastern part of India. Within Uttar Pradesh itself, "the cultural divide between the east and the west is considerable, with the purabiyas (easterners) often being clubbed with Biharis in the perception of the westerners."

History

The empires and dynasties that have ruled parts or all of North India include:
 Maurya Empire, 326 – 187 BCE
 Indo-Greek Kingdom, c.150 BCE – 10 CE (Menander I conquered Punjab)
 Northern Satraps, 1st century BCE to 1st century CE
 Gupta Empire, during the reign of Samudragupta, c.335 – c.550 CE
 Empire of Harsha, 606 to 647 CE
 Pala Empire, 770 to 810 CE
 Pratihara Empire, mid-7th to the 11th century
 Delhi Sultanate, 1206–1526
 Mughal Empire, 1526–1540, then 1555–1857, interrupted briefly by the Sur Empire,
 Sur Empire 1540–1556
 Sikh Empire 1799–1849
 Maratha Empire 1714–1818
 British Indian Empire 1858–1947

The Delhi Sultanate, Mughal and British Indian Empires had Delhi as their capital from time to time.

"North of the Vindhyas"

One demarcation between northern and southern nations has been the Vindhya mountain range. In centuries past this sometimes formed a border during periods of imperial expansion, such as the one ruled by the Gupta emperor Samudragupta. The Vindhyas also find mention in the narrative of Rishi Agastya as a dividing feature between North and South India. The Manusmṛti also describes the southern limit of Aryavarta (i.e. the abode of the Aryans) as being defined by the Vindhya range.

Foreign influences 
Several sources consider sizeable Muslim populations and deep-seated Islamic, Central Asian and Afghan influences to be defining characteristics of North Indian culture, both linguistically and culturally. Some of these influences are pre-Islamic, such as the Bactrian-originated Kushan Empire (modern day Afghanistan) that maintained twin capitals in Mathura (now in Uttar Pradesh) and Peshawar (in the present-day Pakistani Khyber Pakhtunkhwa province), as well as the Hun confederacies that periodically asserted their rule over large parts of North India.

Geography

North India lies mainly on continental India, north of peninsular India. Towards its north are the Himalayas which define the boundary between the Indian subcontinent and the Tibetan plateau. To its west is the Thar desert, shared between North India and Pakistan and the Aravalli Range, beyond which lies the state of Gujarat. The Vindhya mountains are, in some interpretations, taken to be the southern boundary of North India.

The predominant geographical features of North India are:
the Indo-Gangetic plain, which spans the states and union territories of Chandigarh, Delhi, Punjab, Haryana, Uttar Pradesh, Bihar, West Bengal and Jharkhand.
the Himalayas and sub-Himalayan belt, which lie in the states of Uttarakhand, Himachal Pradesh, Jammu and Kashmir and West Bengal;
the Thar desert, which lies mainly in the state of Rajasthan.

The states of Himachal Pradesh, Uttarakhand, and Jammu and Kashmir also have a large forest coverage.

General climate

North India lies mainly in the north temperate zone of the Earth. Though cool or cold winters, hot summers and moderate monsoons are the general pattern. North India is one of the most climatically diverse regions on Earth. During summer, the temperature often rises above 35 °C across much of the Indo-Gangetic plain, reaching as high as 50 °C in the Thar desert, Rajasthan and up to 49 in Delhi. During winter, the lowest temperature on the plains dips to below 5 °C, and below the freezing point in some states. Heavy to moderate snowfall occurs in Himachal Pradesh, Ladakh, J&K and Uttarakhand. Much of North India is notorious for heavy fog during winters.

Dras is claimed to be the second-coldest inhabited place on the planet (after Siberia), with a recorded low of -60 °C.

Precipitation
The region receives heavy rain in plains and light snow on Himalayas precipitation through two primary weather patterns: the Indian Monsoon and the Western Disturbances. The Monsoon carries moisture northwards from the Indian Ocean, occurs in late summer and is important to the Kharif or autumn harvest. Western Disturbances, on the other hand, are an extratropical weather phenomenon that carry moisture eastwards from the Mediterranean Sea, the Caspian Sea and the Atlantic Ocean. They primarily occur during the winter season and are critically important for the Rabi or spring harvest, which includes the main staple over much of North India, wheat. The states of Jammu and Kashmir, Himachal Pradesh and Uttarakhand receive some snowfall in winter months.

Traditional seasons
Northern Indian tradition recognises six distinct seasons in the region: summer (grishma or garmi, May–June), rainy (varsha, July–August), cool (sharad, September–October, sometimes thought of as 'early autumn'), autumn (hemant, November–December, also called patjhar, lit. leaf-fall), winter (shishir or sardi, January–February) and spring (vasant, March–April). The literature, poetry and folklore of the region uses references to these six seasons quite extensively and has done so since ancient times when Sanskrit was prevalent. In the mountainous areas, sometimes the winter is further divided into "big winter" (e.g. Kashmiri chillai kalaan) and "little winter" (chillai khurd).

Demographics
The people of North India mostly belong to the Indo-Aryan ethno linguistic branch, and include various social groups such as Brahmins, Kayasthas, Rajputs, Banias, Jats, Rors, Gurjars, Kolis, Yadavs, Khatris, Kambojs and Dalits. Other minority ethno-linguistic communities such as Dravidian, Tibeto-Burman and Austroasiatic exist throughout the region.

Religion

Hinduism is the dominant religion in North India. Other religions practiced by various ethnic communities include Islam, Sikhism, Jainism, Zoroastrianism, Judaism, Baháʼí, Christianity, and Buddhism. The states of Uttarakhand, Rajasthan, Haryana, and Himachal Pradesh are overwhelmingly Hindu. Uttar Pradesh is also majority Hindu, but it boasts a large Muslim minority as well. The union territories of Jammu and Kashmir and Ladakh have a slight Muslim plurality, Jammu and Kashmir is 35% Hindu with Ladakh having a significant Buddhist minority of around 40% and Jammu having Hindu majority population of 64%. The state of Punjab has a Sikh majority of 60% and is considered to be the homeland of Sikh religion.

Languages

Linguistically, North India is dominated by Indo-Aryan languages. It is in this region, or its proximity, that Sanskrit and the various Prakrits are thought to have evolved. The most widely spoken language in this region is Hindi. It has official status in the states of Haryana, Himachal Pradesh, Rajasthan, Uttarakhand and Uttar Pradesh as well as in the union territory of Delhi. Punjabi has predominance in the state of Punjab where it is the official language. It also has significant presence in the nearby regions. Urdu enjoys official status in Delhi, Jammu and Kashmir and Uttar Pradesh. Further north in Jammu and Kashmir, major languages are Dogri and Kashmiri. Languages like Bengali, Bhili and Nepali are also spoken in notable numbers throughout the region. A large part of North India is taken up by the so-called Hindi Belt, which here subsumes most of the Rajasthani languages, dialects of Western Hindi, Awadhi, Bhojpuri, Garhwali and Kumaoni.

Several Sino-Tibetan languages are spoken in the Himalayan region like Kinnauri, Ladakhi, Balti, and Lahuli–Spiti languages. Austro-Asiatic languages like Korwa/Kodaku is also spoken in some parts of this region.

Culture

The composite culture of North India is known as Ganga-Jamuni tehzeeb, a result of the amicable interaction of Hindus and Muslims there.

Dance

Dance of North India too has diverse folk and classical forms. Among the well-known folk dances are the bhangra of the Punjab, Ghoomar of Rajasthan, Nati of Himachal Pradesh and rouf and bhand pather of Kashmir. Main dance forms, many with narrative forms and mythological elements, have been accorded classical dance status by India's National Academy of Music, Dance, and Drama such as Kathak''.

Clothing

Each state of North India has its own regional forms of clothing:
 Uttar Pradesh: Chikan Suit, Pathani Salwar, Kurta Paijama, Sari .
 Jammu: Kurta/Dogri suthan and kurta/churidar pajama and kurta.
 Kashmir: Phiran and poots.
 Himachal Pradesh: Shalwar kameez, Kurta, Churidar, Dhoti, Himachali cap and angarkha.
 Punjab/Haryana: Salwar (Punjabi) Suit, Patiala salwar, Punjabi Tamba and Kurta, Sikh Dastar, Phulkari, Punjabi Ghagra
 Uttarakhand: Rangwali Phichora

Flora and fauna

North Indian vegetation is predominantly Tropical evergreen and Montane . Of the evergreen trees sal, teak, Mahogany, sheesham (Indian rosewood) and poplar are some which are important commercially. The Western Himalayan region abounds in chir, pine, deodar (Himalayan cedar), blue pine, spruce, various firs, birch and junipers. The birch, especially, has historical significance in Indian culture due to the extensive use of birch paper as parchment for many ancient Indian texts. The Eastern Himalayan region consists of oaks, laurels, maples, rhododendrons, alder, birch and dwarf willows. Reflecting the diverse climatic zones and terrain contained in the region, the floral variety is extensive and ranges from Alpine to Cloud forests, coniferous to evergreen, and thick tropical rainforests to cool temperate woods.

There are around 500 varieties of mammals, 2000 species of birds, 30,000 types of insects and a wide variety of fish, amphibians and reptiles in the region. Animal species in North India include elephant, bengal tiger, indian leopard, snow leopard, sambar (Asiatic stag), chital (spotted deer), hangul (red deer), hog deer, chinkara (Indian gazelle), blackbuck, nilgai (blue bull antelope), porcupine, wild boar, Indian fox, Tibetan sand fox, rhesus monkey, langur, jungle cat, striped hyena, golden jackal, black bear, Himalayan brown bear, sloth bear, and the endangered caracal.

Reptiles are represented by a large number of snake and lizard species, as well as the ghariyal and crocodiles. Venomous snakes found in the region include king cobra and krait. Various scorpion, spider and insect species include the commercially useful honeybees, silkworms and lac insects. The strikingly coloured bir bahuti is also found in this region.

The region has a wide variety of birds, including peafowl, parrots, and thousands of immigrant birds, such as the Siberian crane. Other birds include pheasants, geese, ducks, mynahs, parakeets, pigeons, cranes (including the celebrated sarus crane), and hornbills. great pied hornbill, Pallas's fishing eagle, grey-headed fishing eagle, red-thighed falconet are found in the Himalayan areas. Other birds found here are tawny fish owl, scale-bellied woodpecker, red-breasted parakeet, Himalayan swiftlet, stork-billed kingfisher and Himalayan or white-tailed rubythroat.

Wildlife parks and reserves
Important national parks and tiger reserves of North India include:

Corbett National Park: It was established in 1936 as Hailey National Park
along the banks of the Ramganga River. It is India's first National Park, and was designated a Project Tiger Reserve in 1973. Situated in Nainital district of Uttarakhand, the park acts as a protected area for the critically endangered Bengal tiger of India. Cradled in the foothills of the Himalayas, it comprises a total area of 500 km2 out of which 350 km2 is core reserve. This park is known not only for its rich and varied wildlife but also for its scenic beauty.

Nanda Devi National Park and Valley of Flowers National Park: Located in West Himalaya, in the state of Uttarakhand, these two national parks constitute a biosphere reserve that is in the UNESCO World Network of Biosphere Reserves since 2004. The Valley of Flowers is known for its meadows of endemic alpine flowers and the variety of flora, this richly diverse area is also home to rare and endangered animals.

Dachigam National Park: Dachigam is a higher altitude national reserve in the state of Jammu and Kashmir that ranges from 5,500 to 14,000 feet above sea level. It is home to the hangul (a red deer species, also called the Kashmir stag).

Great Himalayan National Park: This park is located in Himachal Pradesh and ranges in altitude from 5,000 to 17,500 feet. Wildlife resident here includes the snow leopard, the Himalayan brown bear and the musk deer.

Desert National Park: Located in Rajasthan, this national reserve features extensive sand dunes and dry salt lakes. Wildlife unique to the region includes the desert fox and the great Indian bustard.

Kanha National Park: The sal and bamboo forests, grassy meadows and ravines of Kanha were the setting for Rudyard Kipling's collection of stories, "The Jungle Book". The Kanha National Park in Madhya Pradesh came into being in 1955 and forms the core of the Kanha Tiger Reserve, created in 1974 under Project Tiger.

Vikramshila Gangetic Dolphin Sanctuary: Located in the state of Bihar, it is the only protected zone for the endangered Ganges and Indus river dolphin.

Bharatpur Bird Sanctuary: It is one of the finest bird parks in the world, it is a reserve that offers protection to faunal species as well. Nesting indigenous water birds as well as migratory water birds and waterside birds, this sanctuary is also inhabited by sambar, chital, nilgai and boar.

Dudhwa National Park: It covers an area of 500 km2 along the Indo-Nepal border in Lakhimpur Kheri District of Uttar Pradesh, is best known for the barasingha or swamp deer. The grasslands and woodlands of this park, consist mainly of sal forests. The barasingha is found in the southwest and southeast regions of the park. Among the big cats, tigers abound at Dudhwa. There are also a few leopards. The other animals found in large numbers, are the Indian rhinoceros, elephant, jungle cats, leopard cats, fishing cats, jackals, civets, sloth bears, sambar, otters, crocodiles and chital.

Ranthambhore National Park: It spans an area of 400 km2 with an estimated head count of thirty two tigers is perhaps India's finest example of Project Tiger, a conservation effort started by the government in an attempt to save the dwindling number of tigers in India. Situated near the small town of Sawai Madhopur it boasts of variety of plant and animal species of North India.

Kalesar National Park: Kalesar is a sal forest in the Shivalik Hills of eastern Haryana state. Primarily known for birds, it also contains a small number of tigers and panthers.

Places of interest

Nature
The Indian Himalayas, the Thar desert and the Indo-Gangetic plain dominate the natural scenery of North India. The region encompasses several of the most highly regarded hill destinations of India such as Srinagar, Shimla, Manali, Nainital, Mussoorie, Kausani and Mount Abu. Several spots in the states of Uttarakhand and Himachal Pradesh provide panoramic views of the snow-clad Himalayan range. The Himalayan region also provides ample opportunity for adventure sports such as mountaineering, trekking, river rafting and skiing. Camel or jeep safaris of the Thar desert are also popular in the state of Rajasthan. North India includes several national parks such as the Nanda Devi Biosphere Reserve, Jim Corbett National Park, Keoladeo National Park and Ranthambore National Park.

Pilgrimage
North India encompasses several of the holiest pilgrimage centres of Hinduism (Varanasi, Haridwar, Allahabad, Char Dham, Vaishno Devi, Rishikesh, Ayodhya, Mathura/Vrindavan, Pushkar, Prayag and seven of the twelve Jyotirlinga sites), the most sacred destinations of Buddhism (Bodh Gaya, Sarnath and Kushinagar), the most regarded pilgrimage centres of Sikhism (Amritsar and Hemkund) and some of the highly regarded destinations in Sufi Islam (Ajmer and Delhi). The largest Hindu temple, Akshardham Temple, the largest Buddhist temple in India, Mahabodhi, the largest mosque in India, Jama Masjid, and the largest Sikh shrine, Golden Temple, are all in this region.

Historical

North India includes some highly regarded historical, architectural and archaeological treasures of India. The Taj Mahal, an immense mausoleum of white marble in Agra, is one of the universally admired buildings of world heritage. Besides Agra, Fatehpur Sikri and Delhi also carry some great exhibits from the Mughal architecture. In Punjab, Patiala is known for being the city of royalty while Amritsar is a city known for its Sikh architecture and the Golden Temple. Lucknow has the famous Awadhi Nawab culture while Kanpur reflects excellent British architecture with monuments like All Souls Cathedral, King Edward Memorial, Police Quarters, Cawnpore Woollen Mills, Cutchery Cemetery etc. Khajuraho temples constitute another famous world heritage site. The state of Rajasthan is known for exquisite palaces and forts of the Rajput clans. Historical sites and architecture from the ancient and medieval Hindu and Buddhist periods of Indian history, such as Jageshwar, Deogarh and Sanchi, as well as sites from the Bronze Age Indus Valley civilisation, such as Manda and Alamgirpur, can be found scattered throughout northern India. Varanasi, on the banks of the River Ganga, is considered one of the oldest continuously inhabited cities in the world and the second oldest in India after Nalanda. Bhimbetka is an archaeological site of the Paleolithic era, exhibiting the earliest traces of human life on the Indian subcontinent.

Universities
North India has several universities, including

 Agra University
 Alakh Prakash Goyal University
 All India Institute of Medical Sciences
 Allahabad University
 Aligarh Muslim University
 Ashoka University
 Avadh University
 Baba Farid University of Health Sciences
  Babasaheb Bhimrao Ambedkar University
 Bahra University 
 Banaras Hindu University
 Bhagat Phool Singh Mahila Vishwavidyalaya
 Birla Institute of Technology and Science
 Central University of Punjab
 Central University of Rajasthan
 Chandigarh University
 CT University
 DAV University
 Deenbandhu Chhotu Ram University of Science and Technology
 Deen Dayal Upadhyay Gorakhpur University
 Delhi University
 Delhi Technological University
 Desh Bhagat University
 Dr. A.P.J. Abdul Kalam Technical University
 Dr. B.R. Ambedkar National Law University
 Gautam Buddha University
 GNA University
 Govind Ballabh Pant University of Agriculture & Technology
 Gurukul Kangri University
 Guru Jambheshwar University of Science & Technology
 Guru Nanak Dev University
 Guru Gobind Singh Indraprastha University
 Haryana Agricultural University
 Himachal Pradesh University
 Himachal Pradesh National Law University
 Jai Narain Vyas University
 Jawaharlal Nehru University
 Jiwaji University
 Kanpur University
 Kumaon University
 Kurukshetra University
 Lovely Professional University
 Maharaja Ganga Singh University
 Maharana Pratap University of Agriculture and Technology
 National Law University, Sonipat
 O. P. Jindal Global University
 Panjab University
 Punjabi University
 Punjab Agricultural University
 Punjab Technical University
 South Asian University
 Sher-e-Kashmir University of Agricultural Sciences and Technology
 SRM University, Haryana
 Sri Guru Granth Sahib World University
 Thapar University
 University of Jammu
 University of Kashmir
 University of Kota
 University of Lucknow
 University of Rajasthan
 Uttarakhand Technical University
 Vardhaman Mahaveer Open University
 World University of Design

The Indian Institute of Technology, National Institute of Technology and Indian Institute of Management have campuses in several cities of North India such as Delhi, Allahabad, Amritsar, Jammu, Kanpur, Jalandhar, Roorkee, Ropar, Rohtak, Varanasi, Lucknow and Kashipur. One of the first great universities in recorded history, the Nalanda University, is in the state of Bihar. There has been plans for revival of this ancient university, including an effort by a multinational consortium led by Singapore, China, India and Japan.

Economy

The economy of North India is predominantly agrarian, but is changing fast with rapid economic growth that has ranged above 8% annually. Several parts of North India have prospered as a consequence of the Green Revolution, including Punjab, Haryana and Western Uttar Pradesh, and have experienced both economic and social development. The eastern areas of East Uttar Pradesh, however, have lagged and the resulting disparity has contributed to a demand for separate statehood in West Uttar Pradesh (the Harit Pradesh movement).

In 2004, the state with the highest GDP per capita in North India was Punjab followed by Haryana. Chandigarh has the highest per-capita State Domestic Product (SDP) of any Indian union territory. The National Capital Region of Delhi has emerged as an economic power house with rapid industrial growth along with adjoining areas of Uttar Pradesh, Haryana and Rajasthan.

According to a 2009-10 report, a large number of unskilled and skilled workers have moved to southern India and other nations because of the unavailability of jobs locally. The technology boom that occurred in the past three decades in southern India has helped many Indians from the northern region to find jobs and live prosperous lives in southern cities. An analysis by Multidimensional Poverty Index creators reveals that acute poverty prevails in eight Indian states including the northern states of Rajasthan and Uttar Pradesh.

Best Food Items

The best-known  North-Indian food items are:
Tandoori chicken
Reshmi kabab
Kadhai Paneer
Chole bhature
Aloo paratha
Butter chicken

See also
 India
 Northeast India
 East India
 South India
 Western India
 Central India
 Administrative divisions of India

Notes

References

External links 

 North Indian temple architecture
 Geographia.com: India
 Tourist places in North India

Regions of India